The  Ōu Honsen (奥羽本戦, Main battle of Ōu, a pun on the Ou Line railroad traversing the prefectures) is a footballing rivalry played between Blaublitz Akita and Montedio Yamagata, both professional J.League teams from the cities in the former Dewa Province, Japan. It is also known as the Dewa derby or  Chokaisan derby, and named after Japan Railways Ōu Main Line which connects Akita City and Tendo, Yamagata. Series winners can wear home kits at the opponent's stadium next season.

Stadiums
The game is usually hosted at Soyu Stadium and ND Soft Stadium Yamagata. The two stadiums are approximately 156 km (97 miles) apart.

Past results
Statistics as of 17 July 2022

Tohoku Soccer League
TDK were relegated into the regional league ahead of the 1987 season. The derby was first contested in 1990 when Tsuruoka club was promoted to Tohoku Soccer League. Yamagata won the Ōu League four times in a row between 1990 and 1993 before being accepted into the Japan Football League ahead of the 1994 season. The two teams did not play each other in the league again until the 2021 J2 League season after Akita's promotion as J3 champions.

{| class="wikitable" style="border-collapse:collapse; text-align:center; font-size:100%;"
!Season!!Date!!colspan="2"|(Stage/)Week!!Location!!Home!!Score!!Away!!Attendance
|-
|rowspan="2"|1990||-||rowspan="8"|T||-||Yamagata Prefecture||style="color:#FFF338; background:#014099;"|Yamagata Nippon Electric||style="color:black; background:#FFFFCC;"|0–0||style="color:white; background:#006AB6;"|TDK||align=right|-
|-
||-||-||Akita Prefecture||style="color:white; background:#006AB6;"|TDK||style="color:black; background:#FFFFCC;"|1–1||style="color:#FFF338; background:#014099;"|Yamagata Nippon Electric||align=right|-
|-
|rowspan="2"|1991||-||-||Yamagata Prefecture||style="color:#FFF338; background:#014099;"|Yamagata Nippon Electric||style="color:#FFF338; background:#014099;"|9–1||style="color:white; background:#006AB6;"|TDK||align=right|-
|-
||-||-||Akita Prefecture||style="color:white; background:#006AB6;"|TDK||style="color:#FFF338; background:#014099;"|1–3||style="color:#FFF338; background:#014099;"|Yamagata Nippon Electric||align=right|-
|-
|rowspan="2"|1992||-||-||Yamagata Prefecture||style="color:#FFF338; background:#014099;"|NEC Yamagata||style="color:#FFF338; background:#014099;"|2–0||style="color:white; background:#006AB6;"|TDK||align=right|-
|-
||-||-||Akita Prefecture||style="color:white; background:#006AB6;"|TDK||style="color:#FFF338; background:#014099;"|0–4||style="color:#FFF338; background:#014099;"|NEC Yamagata||align=right|-
|-
|rowspan="2"|1993||-||-||Yamagata Prefecture||style="color:#FFF338; background:#014099;"|NEC Yamagata||style="color:#FFF338; background:#014099;"|7–0||style="color:white; background:#006AB6;"|TDK||align=right|-
|-
||-||-||Akita Prefecture||style="color:white; background:#006AB6;"|TDK||style="color:#FFF338; background:#014099;"|0–5||style="color:#FFF338; background:#014099;"|NEC Yamagata||align=right|-
|-

Emperor's Cup
The derby was also played twice in the Emperor's Cup. 
{| class="wikitable" style="border-collapse:collapse; text-align:center; font-size:100%;"
!Season!!Date!!colspan="2"|(Stage/)Week!!Venue!!Home!!Score!!Away!!Attendance
|-
|2010||September 5||rowspan="2"|E||-||ND Soft Stadium Yamagata||style="color:#FFF338; background:#014099;"|Montedio Yamagata||style="color:#FFF338; background:#014099;"|3–0||style="color:white; background:#006AB6;"|Blaublitz Akita||align=right|3,085
|-
|2011||October 8||-||ND Soft Stadium Yamagata||style="color:#FFF338; background:#014099;"|Montedio Yamagata||style="color:#FFF338; background:#014099;"|2–0||style="color:white; background:#006AB6;"|Blaublitz Akita||align=right| 2,425
|-

J2 League
The clubs met again in the J2 League, after Akita got promoted by winning the J3 League. Their first league meeting in 28 years resulted in a scoreless draw at Soyu Stadium.

{| class="wikitable" style="border-collapse:collapse; text-align:center; font-size:100%;"
!Season!!Date!!colspan="2"|(Stage/)Week!!Venue!!Home!!Score!!Away!!Attendance
|-
|rowspan="2"|2021||April 17||rowspan="6"|J2||8||Soyu Stadium||style="color:white; background:#006AB6;"|Blaublitz Akita||style="color:black; background:#FFFFCC;"|0–0||style="color:#FFF338; background:#014099;"|Montedio Yamagata||align=right|1,777
|-
|October 10||33||ND Soft Stadium Yamagata||style="color:#FFF338; background:#014099;"|Montedio Yamagata||style="color:#FFF338; background:#014099;"|2-1||style="color:white; background:#006AB6;"|Blaublitz Akita||align=right| 6,779
|-
|rowspan="2"|2022||April 10||9||ND Soft Stadium Yamagata||style="color:#FFF338; background:#014099;"|Montedio Yamagata||style="color:#FFF338; background:#014099;"|5-1 ||style="color:white; background:#006AB6;"|Blaublitz Akita||align=right|5,722
|-
|July 17||27||Soyu Stadium||style="color:white; background:#006AB6;"|Blaublitz Akita||style="color:#FFF338; background:#014099;"|0-2 ||style="color:#FFF338; background:#014099;"|Montedio Yamagata||align=right| 5,206 
|-
|rowspan="2"|2023||May 21||17||ND Soft Stadium Yamagata||style="color:#FFF338; background:#014099;"|Montedio Yamagata||  ||style="color:white; background:#006AB6;"|Blaublitz Akita||align=right|-
|-
|September 23||36||Soyu Stadium||style="color:white; background:#006AB6;"|Blaublitz Akita||||style="color:#FFF338; background:#014099;"|Montedio Yamagata||align=right| - 
|-

Training matches
They have competed more than 27 practice games together.

Players who have played for both clubs

 Yoshimasa Fujita (Y: 2002–2003, A: 2004)
 Keita Hidaka (Y: 2012–2015, A: 2016–2018)
 Kohei Higa (A: 2011, Y: 2012–2016)
 Han Ho-gang (Y: 2016, A: 2016–2020)
 Yuki Inoue (Y: 2002–2004, A: 2009–2010)
 Kenichi Kaga (Y: 2017–2019, A: 2020–)
 Hideki Matsuda (Y: 2000–2002, A: 2004–2005, 2008)
 Masatoshi Matsuda (Y: 2003–2004, A: 2007, 2009–2013)
 Yuki Takabayashi (Y: 2006, A: 2007–2008)
 Tetsu Takahashi (Y: 1998–1999, A: 2000–2002)

References

External links

Dewa Province
Blaublitz Akita
Montedio Yamagata
Japan football derbies
Ōu Main Line
Nicknamed sporting events

Y. Sasaki
Honda
Kasuga